Sir John Lewis Jones, KCB (17 February 1923 – 9 March 1998) was Director General of MI5, the United Kingdom's internal security service, from 1981 until 1985.

Career
Jones was a native of Wigton in Cumbria, and went to The Nelson Thomlinson School in that town. A graduate of Christ's College, Cambridge, where he read History, he became an officer in the Royal Artillery during World War II and served as a civil servant in the pre-independence Government of Sudan. He joined the Security Service in 1955. He became Deputy Director General in 1976. He was Director General of MI5 from 1981 to 1985.

He was appointed Knight Commander of the Order of the Bath (KCB) in the 1983 New Year Honours.

References

1923 births
1998 deaths
Directors General of MI5
Knights Commander of the Order of the Bath
Royal Artillery officers
People from Wigton
Alumni of Christ's College, Cambridge
British Army personnel of World War II
People educated at the Nelson Thomlinson School